Fourmile Island Rookery is a Wisconsin Department of Natural Resources-designated State Natural Area located within Horicon State Wildlife Area. It features a narrow, forested 15-acre island that serves as one of the largest heron and gull rookeries in the Midwest.

Location and access 
Access is only via Rock River and the island is closed to the public April 1 to September 15.

Description 
Fourmile Island is located within Horicon State Wildlife Area which comprises roughly the southern half of Horicon Marsh. The northern portion is managed as the Horicon National Wildlife Refuge. The island supports one of the largest heron and egret rookeries in the Midwest. Oak, basswood, elm, aspen, and cottonwood trees comprise most of the forest. A July 1984 windstorm that toppled nearly 80 trees, Dutch elm disease, and the effects of heron guano, have reduced the number of trees and therefore the nesting habitat on the island. Artificial nesting platforms have been erected to complement the roughly 500 trees that are suitable nesting sites.

References

External links 
http://dnr.wi.gov/topic/Lands/naturalareas/index.asp?SNA=41 WI DNR
http://dnr.wi.gov/topic/lands/naturalareas/documents/topomaps/map41.pdf

Protected areas of Dodge County, Wisconsin
State Natural Areas of Wisconsin